Southern Indiana is a region consisting of the southern third of the state of Indiana.

The region's history and geography has led to a blend of Northern and Southern culture distinct from the remainder of Indiana. It is often considered to be part of the Upland South and lower Midwest. Southern Indiana was the first area of the state to be settled, and Indiana's first state capital was located in Corydon in Harrison County near the Ohio River. The city of Vincennes, located in the region, is the oldest continually inhabited settlement in Indiana and was the first capital of the Indiana Territory.

The Catholic Church has a significant presence in the region. Noteworthy Catholic institutions in Southern Indiana include St. Meinrad Archabbey, one of two Catholic archabbeys/seminaries in the United States and Mount St. Francis, a large retreat center in Floyd County.

Southern Indiana also differs from the rest of the state linguistically. Southern dialect and South Midland dialect of American English are prevalent, as opposed to the Inland North dialect in far Northern Indiana and the North Midland dialect in Central and North-Central Indiana. Southern Indiana is the northernmost extent of the South Midland region, forming what linguists refer to as the "Hoosier Apex" of the South Midland dialect.

Southern Indiana's topography is considerably more varied and complex than Central and Northern Indiana, and includes large tracts of forest (such as the Hoosier National Forest), rolling fields, and sharp hills. The region also includes the oldest exposed Devonian fossil beds in the world at the Falls of the Ohio state park in Clarksville. In addition the Wabash Valley Seismic Zone is present underneath much of Southwestern Indiana, which adds the danger of earthquakes to the rest of the state. 
The region's largest city is Evansville, in the southwest corner of the state. As of the 2000 census, the city had a total population of 121,582, and a metropolitan population of 342,815. The south-central counties of Clark, Floyd, and Harrison are part of the greater Louisville, Kentucky metropolitan area and have a combined population of over 200,000.

Colleges and universities
Several notable colleges and universities are located in Southern Indiana.

Hanover College
Indiana University Bloomington
Indiana University Southeast
Oakland City University
Saint Meinrad School of Theology
University of Evansville
University of Southern Indiana
Vincennes University

Sports

Professional sports
There are two professional sports teams in the region, both located in Evansville – the Evansville Thunderbirds (founded in 2018), and the Evansville Otters (founded in 1995) play in baseball's independent Frontier League.

College sports
National Collegiate Athletic Association Division I
Indiana Hoosiers  (Monroe County)
Evansville Purple Aces  (Vanderburgh County)
Southern Indiana Screaming Eagles  (Vanderburgh County)
National Collegiate Athletic Association Division II
Oakland City Mighty Oaks  (Gibson County)
National Collegiate Athletic Association Division III
Hanover Panthers  (Jefferson County)
National Association of Intercollegiate Athletics (NAIA)
IU Southeast Grenadiers  (Floyd County)
National Junior College Athletic Association (NJCAA)
Vincennes Trailblazers  (Knox County)

See also

Southern Illinois
Southern Ohio
Evansville, Indiana
Louisville metropolitan area
Cincinnati metropolitan area
Evansville metropolitan Area
University of Southern Indiana
Geography of Indiana
Southwestern Indiana
Illinois–Indiana–Kentucky tri-state area
Kentuckiana
Wabash Valley

References

External links
 Southern Indiana Travel Spots

Regions of Indiana